Natural history of Scotland concerns the flora, fauna and mycota of Scotland.

Flora

The flora of Scotland is an assemblage of native plant species including over 1,600 vascular plants, more than 1,500 lichens and nearly 1,000 bryophytes. The total number of vascular species is low by world standard but lichens and bryophytes are abundant and the latter form a population of global importance. Various populations of rare fern exist, although the impact of 19th century collectors threatened the existence of several species. The flora is generally typical of the north west European part of the Palearctic realm and prominent features of the Scottish flora include boreal Caledonian forest (much reduced from its natural extent), heather moorland and coastal machair. In addition to the native varieties of vascular plants there are numerous non-native introductions, now believed to make up some 43% of the species in the country.

There are a variety of important trees species and specimens; a Douglas fir near Inverness is the tallest tree in the United Kingdom and the Fortingall Yew may be the oldest tree in Europe. The Shetland mouse-ear and Scottish primrose are endemic flowering plants and there are a variety of endemic mosses and lichens. Numerous references to the country's flora appear in folklore, song and poetry.

Fauna

The fauna of Scotland is generally typical of the north-west European part of the Palearctic realm, although several of the country's larger mammals were hunted to extinction in historic times. Scotland's diverse temperate environments support 62 species of wild mammals, including a population of wild cats and important numbers of grey and harbour seals.

Many populations of moorland birds, including blackcock and the famous red grouse, live here, and the country has internationally significant nesting grounds for seabirds such as the northern gannet. The golden eagle has become a national icon, and white-tailed eagles and ospreys have recently re-colonised the land. The Scottish crossbill is the only endemic vertebrate species in the British Isles.

Scotland’s seas are among the most biologically productive in the world; it is estimated that the total number of Scottish marine species exceeds 40,000. Included in the country's ocean inventory are the Darwin Mounds, are an important area of cold water coral reefs discovered in 1988. Inland, nearly 400 genetically distinct populations of Atlantic Salmon live in Scottish rivers. Of the 42 species of fish found in the country's fresh waters, half have arrived by natural colonisation and half by human introduction.

Only six amphibians and four land reptiles are native to Scotland, but many species of invertebrates live here that are otherwise rare in the United Kingdom (UK). An estimated 14,000 species of insect, including rare bees and butterflies protected by conservation action plans inhabit Scotland.

Mycota

Approximately 1,650 species of fungal species are found in Scotland. The rare Phelloden confluens is found in five or fewer 10 km squares.

Micro-organisms
Syringammina fragilissima is a xenophyophore found off the coast of Scotland, near Rockall.

Conservation organisations
Conservation of the natural environment is well developed and various organisations play an important role in the stewardship of the country's flora and fauna. Many agencies in the UK are concerned that climate change, especially its potential effects on mountain plateaus and marine life, threaten much of the flora and fauna of Scotland.

Where to see Scottish wildlife

It is possible to view whales, dolphins, porpoise, and basking sharks in their natural environment on boat tours of the Hebridean waters. Other places which exhibit Scottish wildlife include:

 Highland Wildlife Park
 Loch Lomond and the Trossachs National Park
 Cairngorms National Park
 Forestry Commission (Scotland)
 Central Scotland Forest Trust

See also
Geography of Scotland
Geology of Scotland

References

Benvie, Neil (2004) Scotland's Wildlife. London. Aurum Press. 
Brown, Leslie (1989) British Birds of Prey. London. Bloomsbury. 
Edwards, Kevin J. & Ralston, Ian B.M. (Eds) (2003) Scotland After the Ice Age: Environment, Archaeology and History, 8000 BC - AD 1000. Edinburgh. Edinburgh University Press. 
Fraser Darling, F. & Boyd, J.M. (1969) Natural History in the Highlands and Islands. London. Bloomsbury. 
Gooders, J. (1994) Field Guide to the Birds of Britain and Ireland. London. Kingfisher. 
Hull, Robin (2007) Scottish Mammals. Edinburgh. Birlinn. 
MacLean, Charles (1972) Island on the Edge of the World: the Story of St. Kilda. Edinburgh. Canongate. 
Matthews, L. Harrison (1968) British Mammals.London. Bloomsbury. 
Miles, H. and Jackman, B. (1991) The Great Wood of Caledon. Lanark. Colin Baxter Photography. 
Murray, W.H. (1973) The Islands of Western Scotland. London. Eyre Methuen. SBN 413303802
 Smout, T.C. MacDonald, R. and Watson, Fiona (2007) A History of the Native Woodlands of Scotland 1500-1920. Edinburgh University Press.

Notes

External links

Scottish Natural Heritage
Forestry Commission Scotland
Joint Nature Conservation Committee
Scottish Wildlife Trust
Royal Zoological Society of Scotland
Scotland's National Nature Reserves
Royal Society for the Protection of Birds
Scottish Seabird Centre
Cairngorms National Park Authority
Loch Lomond & The Trossachs National Park Authority
John Muir Trust
Trees for Life
Butterfly Conservation Scotland